Beamud is a municipality located in the province of Cuenca, Castile-La Mancha, Spain. It has a population of 48 (2014).

References 

Municipalities in the Province of Cuenca